Blue Guitars is a studio album by singer/songwriter Stephen Bishop. An album with the same title was released in Japan in 1994.

The Japanese release includes two tracks, "Yeh Yeh" and "Natalie", not found on the American version. The American release includes two tracks, "On Blonde Street" and "Wall Around Your Heart", not found on the Japanese version. These tracks were produced by Jeff Jones. All others were produced by Andrew Gold. Some track lengths are also substantially different between the two releases.

Track listing
All songs written by Stephen Bishop, except where noted.

Personnel 
 Stephen Bishop – vocals, acoustic guitars 
 Andrew Gold – keyboards, acoustic guitars, electric guitars, bass, drums, multi-instruments, backing vocals 
 David Crosby – harmony vocals (2)
 Carnie Wilson – backing vocals 
 Wendy Wilson – backing vocals 
 Pia Zadora – backing vocals 
 Michael McDonald – backing vocals (2)

References

1996 albums
Stephen Bishop (singer) albums
albums produced by Andrew Gold